The Strigeoidea are a superfamily of flatworms, belonging to the large group Digenea. Many species are endoparasites.

References 

Diplostomida
Animal superfamilies